Pea Fröhlich (born 1943) is a German screenwriter and psychologist, best known for co-writing all three films of the BRD Trilogy: The Marriage of Maria Braun, Veronika Voss and Lola. She also wrote for Bloch.

Filmography 
 1979: The Marriage of Maria Braun (dir. Rainer Werner Fassbinder)
 1981:  (dir. Walter Bockmayer)
 1981: Lola (dir. Rainer Werner Fassbinder)
 1982: Veronika Voss (dir. Rainer Werner Fassbinder)
 1985:  (dir. Peter Keglevic)
 1987: The Cry of the Owl (dir. ), TV film
 1989: Radiofieber (dir. Dietrich Haugk), TV miniseries
 1991: The Indecent Woman (dir. Ben Verbong)
 1992: Haus am See (dir. ), TV series
 1994: Weihnachten mit Willy Wuff (dir. Maria Theresia Wagner), TV film
 1995: Deutschlandlied (dir. Tom Toelle), TV miniseries
 1996: Tatort: Das Mädchen mit der Puppe (dir. Markus Fischer), TV
 2002:  (dir. Reto Salimbeni), TV film
 2002–2005: Bloch, TV series, 7 episodes
 2006:  (dir. Margarethe von Trotta)

References

External links

20th-century German screenwriters
German women screenwriters
German television writers
Living people
1943 births
Women television writers
20th-century German women writers
21st-century German screenwriters
21st-century German women writers